Falls Township is a township in Chase County, Kansas, United States.  As of the 2000 census, its population was 1,163.

Geography
The streams of Buck Creek, South Fork Cottonwood River, Spring Creek and Stout Run run through this township.

Communities
The township contains the following settlements:
 City of Cottonwood Falls.

Cemeteries
The township contains the following cemeteries:
 Miller.
 Prairie Grove.

Transportation
Falls Township contains one airport or landing strip, Chase County Airport.

Further reading

References

External links
 Chase County Website
 Burnley Memorial Library - Falls Township - Chase Co. Kansas
 City-Data.com
 Chase County Maps: Current, Historic, KDOT

Townships in Chase County, Kansas
Townships in Kansas